Anolis paternus the ashy bush anole or Nueva Gerona anole, is a species of lizard in the family Dactyloidae. The species is found on Isla de la Juventud in Cuba.

References

Anoles
Reptiles described in 1967
Endemic fauna of Cuba
Reptiles of Cuba